News 24 is a 24-hour Hindi news television channel owned by B.A.G. Films and Media Limited. It has been launched in 2007 and it is free-to-air channel in India. News 24 changed its logo with a new design.

Promoted by Anurradha Prasad, sister of former Union Minister Ravi Shankar Prasad, along with her husband, Indian National Congress politician Rajeev Shukla. Anuradha Prasad is the chairperson and managing director of B.A.G. Films and Media Limited.

News 24 is a media conglomerate with diversified interests in production, television broadcasting, radio, new media ventures and education.

TV shows 
 Sabse Bada Sawal
 Rashtra Ki Baat
 Mahaul Kya Hai?
 Kalchakra

References 

24-hour television news channels in India
Television channels and stations established in 2007
Television stations in New Delhi
Hindi-language television channels in India